Thornton Butler was a state legislator in Louisiana. He lived in New Orleans and served in the Louisiana House of Representatives.

He represented the fourth district of the Orleans Parish. He took office January 22, 1874 after a protracted election dispute. He served until 1880.

See also
African-American officeholders during and following the Reconstruction era

References

Members of the Louisiana House of Representatives
Politicians from New Orleans
African-American politicians during the Reconstruction Era
19th-century American politicians
African-American state legislators in Louisiana
Year of birth missing
Year of death missing